Bilinda Jayne Butcher (born 16 September 1961) is an English musician and singer-songwriter, best known as a vocalist and guitarist of the shoegaze band My Bloody Valentine.

Early life
Butcher was born and raised in London and later relocated with her parents and older sister Jo-Anne to Golden Valley, Derbyshire, a small hamlet in the countryside. Her forename is an alternate spelling of Belinda and was chosen by her mother. Butcher has been quoted as saying, "if I'd been a guy I would have been named Bill, but since I was a girl it became Bilinda".

Butcher has said that growing up in Golden Valley she was considered "a weirdo" as she wore clothes based on 1920s fashion and listened to records on a portable gramophone. Butcher stated: "My mother thought I was up in the clouds. I never watched the news or read the papers; it was like I lived in another era. Everybody was into punk and I was living in the '20s and '30s." At age sixteen, Butcher moved back to London and began studying dance at the Trinity Laban Conservatoire of Music and Dance, but left after a year. 

After leaving Trinity Laban, Butcher worked as a nanny for a French family in London for six months and later moved to Paris for another six months with her partner. The pair moved back to London, squatting in Brixton, and had a child, Toby.

Music career

My Bloody Valentine

Butcher was recruited as a vocalist for My Bloody Valentine in April 1987. She replaced original vocalist David Conway and shared vocal duties briefly with Joe Byfield. Butcher, whose prior musical experience was playing classical guitar as a child and singing and playing tambourine "with some girlfriends for fun", learned that the group needed a backing vocalist from her boyfriend, who had met drummer Colm Ó Cíosóig on a ferry from the Netherlands. At her audition for the band, she sang "The Bargain Store", a song from Dolly Parton's 1975 album of the same name. She was chosen as a vocalist ahead of a girl called Julie who was in a relationship with Douglas Hart from The Jesus and Mary Chain.

Butcher was featured as co-vocalist and co-guitarist on My Bloody Valentine's non-album single, "Strawberry Wine", and the band's second mini album, Ecstasy, both of which were released in 1987 on Lazy Records. She performed vocals and guitar on all further My Bloody Valentine releases, until the band's second studio album Loveless (1991), on which her guitar duties were performed by co-vocalist and guitarist Kevin Shields. She contributed a third of the lyrics to Isn't Anything (1988) and Loveless, as well as other releases including You Made Me Realise (1988), Glider (1990) and Tremolo (1991).

My Bloody Valentine attempted to record a third studio album after signing with Island Records in October 1992 for a reported £250,000 contract. The band's advance went towards the construction of a home studio in Streatham, South London, which was completed in April 1993. Several technical problems with the studio sent the band into "semi-meltdown", according to Shields. Despite suggestions to the contrary, Butcher never left the band, although she did leave the home studio in Streatham. My Bloody Valentine reunited in 2007, and released their third album, m b v, in 2013.

Collaborations
During My Bloody Valentine's hiatus, Butcher collaborated with two major bands. She performed lead vocals on two tracks—"Ballad Night" and "Casino Kisschase"—on the hip hop band Collapsed Lung's album Cooler (1996), and performed backing vocals on the Dinosaur Jr song "I Don't Think" from Hand It Over (1997). At Primavera Sound in 2013, Butcher performed with The Jesus and Mary Chain, providing vocals on "Just Like Honey".

Artistry
Butcher's vocals have been referred to as a trademark of My Bloody Valentine's sound, alongside Kevin Shields' guitar techniques. On a number of occasions during the recording of Isn't Anything, Butcher was awoken and recorded vocals, which she said "influenced [her] sound" by making them "more dreamy and sleepy". A similar process was used during the recording of Loveless, on which her vocals have been described as "dreamy [and] sensual". Explaining the situation, Butcher said: "often when we do vocals, it's 7:30 in the morning; I've usually just fallen asleep and have to be woken up to sing … I'm usually trying to remember what I've been dreaming about when I'm singing". Her singing was originally influenced by Françoise Hardy and later by Kim Gordon of Sonic Youth.

Butcher wrote a third of the lyrics on both Isn't Anything and Loveless. According to Butcher, she "didn't have a plan and never thought about lyrics until it was time to write them. I just used whatever was in my head for the moment". Some of her lyrics were written as a result of attempting to understand rough versions of songs Shields had recorded. Butcher has said: "He [Shields] never sang any words on the cassettes I got but I tried to make his sounds into words. It always became my own thing in the end though".

Like Shields, Butcher uses a number of offset guitars. Her most notable instruments include several Fender electric guitars, including Jaguars, Jazzmasters and Mustangs. On occasion, Butcher uses a Charvel Surfcaster, which she has referred to as her favourite guitar. When performing live, Butcher uses a minimal number of effects pedals and processors.

During her adolescence, Butcher became a fan of gothic rock bands such as Bauhaus, and later post-punk artists such as The Birthday Party.

References

Bibliography

External links

1961 births
Living people
Alternative rock guitarists
Alternative rock keyboardists
Alternative rock singers
English rock keyboardists
English rock guitarists
English rock singers
English female dancers
English women guitarists
Women rock singers
British women singer-songwriters
Musicians from London
My Bloody Valentine (band) members
People from Amber Valley
Shoegaze musicians
Singers from London
20th-century English women singers
20th-century English singers
21st-century English women singers
21st-century English singers